Courts of North Carolina include:
;State courts of North Carolina
North Carolina Supreme Court
North Carolina Court of Appeals
North Carolina Superior Court (46 districts)
North Carolina District Courts (45 districts)

Federal courts located in North Carolina
United States District Court for the Eastern District of North Carolina
United States District Court for the Middle District of North Carolina
United States District Court for the Western District of North Carolina

Former federal courts of North Carolina
United States District Court for the District of North Carolina (extinct, subdivided)
United States District Court for the District of Edenton (1794–1797; extinct, reorganized)
United States District Court for the District of New Bern (1794–1797; extinct, reorganized)
United States District Court for the District of Wilmington (1794–1797; extinct, reorganized)
United States District Court for the District of Albemarle (1801–1872; extinct, reorganized)
United States District Court for the District of Cape Fear (1801–1872; extinct, reorganized)
United States District Court for the District of Pamptico (1801–1872; extinct, reorganized)

References

External links
National Center for State Courts – directory of state court websites.

Courts in the United States
North Carolina state courts